Silver Screen Pictures was first established in 2004 under the original name Silver Screen Productions before registering as Australian business, Silver Screen Pictures in 2006. The film, media and production company was first established in Brisbane, Australia by Director Alex Barnes and later partnered with by his Producer Justin Morrissey in early 2009. The company predominantly work in Music Videos, Corporate and documentary Production.

Not A Willing Participant
Silver Screen Pictures first major international production was the 27-minute documentary "Not A Willing Participant", 2009, which featured Australian Indigenous artist Vernon Ah Kee and his journey to represent Australia at the 53rd Venice Biennale of Art. The film premiered in Utah, USA at the Slamdance Film Festival, and later screened on the ABC (Australian Broadcasting Corporation) in 2010. "Not A Willing Participant" has also screened on Qantas inflight entertainment and the 2010 Dungog Film Festival.

References

External links

Film production companies of Australia